Guadalupiidae is an extinct family of fossil sponges that lived from the Pennsylvanian (Carboniferous) until the Norian (Late Triassic). It includes the following taxa:

Cystauletes R. H. King, 1943
Cystauletes mammilosus R. H. King, 1943
Cystothalamia Girty, 1908
Cystothalamia megacysta Finks, 2010
Cystothalamia nodulifera Girty, 1908
Diecithalamia Senowbari-Daryan, 1990
Diecithalamia polysiphonata Dieci et al., 1968
Exovasa Finks, 2010
Exovasa cystauletoides Finks, 2010
Guadalupia Girty, 1908
Guadalupia auricula Finks, 2010
Guadalupia cupulosa Finks, 2010
Guadalupia digitata Girty, 1908
Guadalupia favosa Girty, 1908
Guadalupia lepta Finks, 2010
Guadalupia microcamera Finks, 2010
Guadalupia minuta Rigby and Bell, 2006
Guadalupia ramescens Finks, 2010
Guadalupia vasa Finks, 2010
Guadalupia williamsi R. H. King, 1943
Guadalupia zitteliana Girty, 1908
Incisimura Finks, 2010
Incisimura bella Finks, 2010
Lemonea Senowbari-Daryan, 1990
Lemonea conica Senowbari-Daryan, 1990
Lemonea cylindrica (Girty, 1908)
Lemonea polysiphonata Senowbari-Daryan, 1990
Lemonea simplex Finks, 2010
"Lemonea" exaulifera (Rigby et al., 1998)
"Lemonea" micra Rigby et al., 1998
Polyphymaspongia R. H. King, 1943
Polyphymaspongia explanata R. H. King, 1943

See also
List of prehistoric sponges

References